Günter Haritz (born 16 October 1948) is a retired road and track cyclist from West Germany, who won the gold medal in the Men's 4.000 Team Pursuit at the 1972 Summer Olympics in Munich, alongside Günther Schumacher, Jürgen Colombo, and Udo Hempel. 
In 1973, together with Peter Vonhof, Hans Lutz and Günther Schumacher, Haritz won the amateur world title in the team pursuit.

Subsequently, he was a professional cyclist from 1973 to 1982, winning the national championship on the road in 1974 and becoming second and third in 1975 and 1976 respectively and third in 1979. The chief part of his professional career concerned racing on the track however.  Haritz rode 83 Six-day races, winning 11 of them in the period 1975-1977 during which he belonged to the top 5 riders in the 'Sixes'.
7 of which he won with René Pijnen, 2 with Dietrich Thurau (both of whom his then team-mates with TI–Raleigh), 1 with Patrick Sercu the 1975 Six Days of Zürich and 1, in Grenoble, with the Frenchman Bernard Thévenet.

In the 1976 Grenoble Six, track specialist Haritz and 'road cyclist' Thévenet, who then had won the 1975 Tour de France and the 1975 and 1976 editions of the Critérium du Dauphiné Libéré, claimed the victory against famous road cyclist Francesco Moser, who, like Thévenet, was coupled with an (eminent) track specialist, Pijnen (2nd), as well as beating the equally famous road rider Felice Gimondi who was also with coupled an eminent track specialist, Patrick Sercu (3rd), and notably then road champion Joop Zoetemelk (10th) and future five times Tour de France winner Bernard Hinault (12th and last).

Corroborating his performances in the Six-Day races in these years, he won the 1975 edition of the European championship Derny racing and in 1976 with Pijnen the prestigious European championship Madison in Zürich, notably beating the Australians Danny Clark and Donald Allan (2nd) and Sercu and Klaus Bugdahl (3rd). In 1977 in Copenhagen with Wilfried Peffgen, he took the bronze medal in the European championship Madison that was won by the Belgian couple Patrick Sercu, Eddy Merckx.

In the 1976 Vuelta a España, Haritz tested positive for doping, and left the race after the B-test also was positive.

References

External links

1948 births
Living people
German track cyclists
German male cyclists
Cyclists at the 1972 Summer Olympics
Olympic cyclists of West Germany
Olympic gold medalists for West Germany
Sportspeople from Heidelberg
Olympic medalists in cycling
German cycling road race champions
Medalists at the 1972 Summer Olympics
Cyclists from Baden-Württemberg
20th-century German people